The Spring Valley School near Larkspur, Colorado was built in 1874.  It was listed on the National Register of Historic Places in 1978.  It has also been known as The School House.  The listing included four contributing buildings: the school and three outbuildings.

It was the first of about 100 one-room schoolhouses built in Douglas County.  It had a 100-year lease which expired, and ownership transferred from a historical society to another owner.

References

School buildings on the National Register of Historic Places in Colorado
One-room schoolhouses in Colorado
School buildings completed in 1874
Buildings and structures in Douglas County, Colorado
Defunct schools in Colorado
National Register of Historic Places in Douglas County, Colorado